Break-Up is an independent German experimental feature film comedy directed by Alexander Tuschinski. It received awards at international film-festivals and had its German premiere at Berlin Independent Film Festival 2015. Although it is not part of it, it is connected to Tuschinski's informal Trilogy of Rebellion by one main character and some references in the storyline.

Plot 
The film is about a satire on modern life and on the nature of power, interweaving many subplots to create an overview of young people's lives today. It is told in an experimental visual- and editing style. The film has been called an experimental film.

The film consists of four chapters that are explicitly named in the storyline. Their names correspond with the general theme of each chapter:

 1. Break Out - The opening of the film consists mainly of people breaking out of their regular world and conventional lifestyles.
 2. Break In - The second chapter starts with the character John "breaking into" a married relationship, and ideologies "breaking in" Arnold's mind.
 3. Break Free! - The third chapter starts with a trial, and Arnold breaking free from all the ideologies that had influenced him before. It ends with Arnold being badly beaten up, lying on the floor without any illusions left.
 4. Break Up - The fourth and final chapter deals with John finally breaking up with his girlfriend - and destroying the planet in the process in a surrealistic scene. He is thus metaphorically "breaking up" with all that is wrong in the world as it was depicted in the previous chapters.

Themes

Literature 
Throughout the film, there are numerous references to literary works that sometimes are integral to scenes.

Franz Kafka's The Trial 
The Trial by Franz Kafka is referenced throughout the storyline, the reference becoming clear towards the middle. After Josef Köhler - played by actor Dominic Rödel - refuses to hire Arnold, the latter pretends to be him while insulting a police officer, which ultimately leads to the arrest of (innocent) Köhler. After he is arrested, an off-narrator reads the first sentence from Kafka's book as a direct reference to it.

Das Fahrzeug 
The novel Das Fahrzeug by the film's director is depicted multiple times, always bringing bad luck to its readers as a self-ironic element.

Breaking the fourth wall 
One major theme / stylistic device in Break-Up is breaking the fourth wall. Occasionally, character's remarks reveal that they're aware they're acting in a film. In the beginning, John explains Jane how Break-Up would become boring if they met each other with smalltalk. When they disturb the set of a pretentious student-film, the characters use the film Break-Up as an example of a better film, eventually dragging the cinematographer Matthias Kirste who is filming them into the discussion. Later, when John tells Jane to wait at the cemetery, he tells her that waiting is not bad, because when she's not shown in the film, she doesn't exist. One major scene breaking the fourth wall is the start of the second half, when during a serious scene, suddenly the police walks in to arrest the cast and crew after one actors starts shouting that he doesn't like the direction the film is taking anymore. The following, surrealistic trial - in which the actors and the director are tried for disturbing public order - suddenly reveals that the character Arnold was acting in the film we just saw, and he now becomes homeless after losing everything.

Different layers of reality
In Break-Up, multiple times the reality of portrayed events within the film's structure is questioned. After Arnold leaves John and Jane in the beginning, he declares that the whole beginning was a dream that ended with him in World War II. A while later, Lutz (who later turns into Silvameshi) proclaims that all of the previous evens were part of his dream that ends in World War II. Later on, it is revealed that the film was actually a video game played by an unseen player - which is never realized by the characters, even though their world suddenly becomes a computer-game.

Emotionally detaching the viewer
At some points of the film, an arts critic appears, criticising the film and sometimes cutting out / fast forwarding segments to give it more speed. That critic is a parody of pretentious arts criticism and appears during "romantic" or otherwise emotional moments to make the audience aware of the methods to evoke emotions used by films in general. Tuschinski describes the dramatic theories by Bertold Brecht as a major influence for Break-Up, making the viewers rationally think about what they see by detaching them emotionally. One example would be after John meets the wife and she falls in love with him, the arts critic suddenly appears, telling the viewer he'll cut out "more of that stuff" to get back on track, displaying a brief slapstick comedy short film while the film is re-edited to be less romantic.

Production

Overview 
The film is considered a Low-Budget-Film. The cast consists of 44 mostly first- or second-time actors. After creating Menschenliebe, Alexander Tuschinski wanted to try a new, experimental approach to shape a film's style and story, mostly following new impulses and ideas on set while filming. Thus, many parts of the film were improvised on the set, having only a rough outline of many scenes before filming. As a part of the experimental filming process, Alexander Tuschinski only wrote a detailed screenplay for the first 15 minutes of the film before filming started. Afterwards, during filming, he often followed spontaneous impulses to create the story.

Development 
Alexander Tuschinski started writing a theatre play right after filming Menschenliebe had wrapped in 2009. The opening scene of the play was a humorous analysis of smalltalk and dating. While writing, Tuschinski decided to shelve the incomplete play, instead including parts of it in his next feature-film. The play's opening scene incorporated without changes in Break-Up. Until April 2010, Tuschinski had written a screenplay for the first 15 minutes of the film, and a rough outline for the remainder. That first outline differs significantly from how the film ultimately developed. Tuschinski chose this approach because after producing Menschenliebe, he wanted to do a very different film. Working on a similar budget, he intended to make the experimental production process integral to the final film. One of his main inspirations working on Break-Up were experimental 1960s films by Tinto Brass, most notable Nerosubianco and The Howl. Two songs from the soundtrack of Nerosubianco were used in Break-Up, and it features some hommages to Tinto Brass' films - that are directly named as hommages by characters in Break-Up, breaking the fourth wall.

Casting 
For Break-Up, Tuschinski cast many actors with whom he had already collaborated in Menschenliebe and earlier projects, in addition to numerous first-time actors. Due to the production's experimental, spontaneous nature, some actors were cast right before the day of filming. Because to the experimental writing style, roles could be expanded or changed easily. Philipp Metzler, who plays a lead character in Break-Up, for example, was originally cast in a very small role as a literature student during a student picnic. As Tuschinski was impressed by his performance, he decided to merge multiple characters into one, creating a new lead character portrayed by Metzler. Sebastian B. reprises his role as Arnold Richter from Menschenliebe. Beside having the same name and being portrayed by the same actor, his character is similar, but not the same as the character in Menschenliebe. Break-Up marks the screen debut of Jennifer Pakosch, who also collaborated on the film as an assistant director and was later cast in a starring part in Timeless.

Filming 
Filming started in early 2011 and the last days of filming took place in early 2013. The first scenes filmed were scenes of John and the wife on a date, and the last ones were those in Silvameshi's ashram. Tuschinski filmed Break-Up parallel to his studies mostly on weekends. Production briefly paused while he was promoting Menschenliebe and when he reconstructed Tinto Brass' director's cut of Caligula. For Tuschinski, the production-style of Break-Up was an experiment, having a film "organically" grow over two years instead of pre-planning it. Often, he wrote detailed scenes the morning before filming them, having a rough idea of the set and the necessary actors before filming, re-shaping the structure of the whole film after filming each scene took place. For example, the idea for the character "Silvameshi" came about only in May 2012, and the yet unfilmed second half of the film was designed around that character. 
Tuschinski regards this production-style as a deliberate one-time experiment, as his following feature Timeless was again filmed in a relatively short period of time with a detailed screenplay. For Break-Up, Tuschinski collaborated with cinematographer Matthias Kirste and the film was shot with one camera, using many takes to get a lot of experimental camera angles. The film uses a lot of different stylistic means, be they fisheye-lenses, black&white footage shot on filmstock, and others.

Editing 
Most scenes were edited by Tuschinski right the very night after filming them. For him, this working style is important, as he keeps a list of shots and possible edits in his head during filming, and prefers editing when all the shots and different takes are still fresh in his memory. The first rough cut of the whole film was ready by mid 2013. For the next months, music rights were cleared. There are two original songs in the film. The editing-style is described as impressionist, often editing scenes to music. During editing, the structure of the film was reshaped and refined, and Tuschinski considers editing Break-Up an integral part of its writing process.

Release 
The film was released at various festivals (see list of awards below).

Reception

Awards 

The film won the following awards:
 Best Foreign Film: American Movie Awards 2014.
 Best Director: Maverick Movie Awards 2014.
 Best International Film: Hollywood Reel Independent Film Festival 2015.
 Best Editing: Hollywood Reel Independent Film Festival 2015.
 Best Comedy Film - Silver Remi Award: WorldFest-Houston International Film Festival 2014.
 Best Editing: Oregon Independent Film Festival 2014.
 Best Foreign Feature: Oregon Independent Film Festival 2014.
 Gold Award - Foreign Film: California Film Awards 2014.

Screenings 
 In September 2014, Oregon Independent Film Festival screened a special "Director's Preview Edit" of Break-Up, different from the regular cut of the film, as part of its official festival program in competition in a sold out screening.

References

External links 
 
 Making-Of documentary about Break-Up. (Video)
 Official Press-Book about Break-Up, including production notes, manifesto by the director, and other material. (PDF; 3,2 MB)
 Stuttgarter Zeitung: Article about Alexander Tuschinski's film Timeless, mentioning Break-Up winning at American Movie Awards.

2014 films
2010s German-language films
2010s avant-garde and experimental films
2014 comedy films
Films directed by Alexander Tuschinski
German avant-garde and experimental films
2010s German films